Cajunga is a city located in northwestern Peru in the Piura Region. 

The official languages are both Spanish and Quechua.

References

 

Populated places in the Piura Region